This is a list of Mind Trekkers events.

References

Mind
Science education in the United States